The 2012 Gastein Ladies was a professional women's tennis tournament played on outdoor clay courts. It was the sixth edition of the tournament which was part of the 2012 WTA Tour. It took place in Bad Gastein, Austria between 9 and 17 June 2012. Alizé Cornet won the singles title.

Singles main draw entrants

Seeds

 1 Rankings are as of 28 May 2012

Other entrants
The following players received wildcards into the singles main draw:
  Barbara Haas
  Nicole Rottmann
  Yanina Wickmayer

The following players received entry from the qualifying draw:
  Jana Čepelová
  Dia Evtimova
  Richèl Hogenkamp
  Chichi Scholl

Withdrawals
  Sara Errani (fatigue)
  Polona Hercog
  Silvia Soler-Espinosa
  Aleksandra Wozniak

Doubles main draw entrants

Seeds

1 Rankings are as of 28 May 2012

Other entrants
The following pairs received wildcards into the doubles main draw:
  Barbara Haas /  Janina Toljan
  Yvonne Neuwirth /  Nicole Rottmann
The following pair received entry as alternates:
  Hana Birnerová /  Richèl Hogenkamp

Withdrawals
  Eva Birnerová (right thigh injury)

Finals

Singles

 Alizé Cornet defeated  Yanina Wickmayer, 7–5, 7–6(7–1)

Doubles

 Jill Craybas /  Julia Görges defeated  Anna-Lena Grönefeld /  Petra Martić, 6–7(4–7), 6–4, [11–9]

References

External links
 Official website

Gastein Ladies
Gastein Ladies
2012 in Austrian women's sport
June 2012 sports events in Europe
2012 in Austrian tennis